Reg or Reginald Edwards may refer to:

Reg Edwards (rugby union) (1893–1951), English rugby union player 
Reg Edwards (footballer, born 1912) (1912–?), English footballer who played in the Football League for Burnley and Walsall
Reg Edwards (footballer, born 1953), English footballer who played in the Football League for Port Vale
Reg Edwards (Australian footballer) (born 1943), Australian rules footballer
Reginald Edwards (cricketer) (1881–1925), English cricketer